The 1956 Davidson Wildcats football team represented Davidson College as a member of the Southern Conference (SoCon) during the 1956 NCAA University Division football season. Led by fifth-year head coach Bill Dole, the Wildcats compiled an overall record of 5–3–1 with a mark of 2–2–1 in conference play, tying for fourth place in the SoCon.

Schedule

References

Davidson
Davidson Wildcats football seasons
Davidson Wildcats football